Araragi enthea is a small butterfly found in the East Palearctic that belongs to the lycaenids or blues family.

Description from Seitz

Z. enthea Jans. (74 e). Above dark black-brown, beyond the cell two pale spots in Japanese specimens, and two white ones in (Chinese individuals). Underside whitish, with smaller and larger, partly seriated [To arrange in serial order], dark spots, the anal area of the hindwing being orange. — Widely distributed, from West China to Amurland and Japan. Larva according to Graeser uniformly pale green, until July on Juglans mandschurica. The butterfly in July and August, plentiful in certain places.

See also
List of butterflies of Russia

References

Theclini
Taxa named by Oliver Erichson Janson